Hurricane Relief: Come Together Now is a 2005 two-disc compilation album.
RIAA will donate 100% of its net proceeds from the sale of this CD in equal parts to the American Red Cross, Habitat for Humanity and MusiCares Hurricane Relief 2005.

Track listing
Disc: 1
"Do You Know What It Means To Miss New Orleans?"  – 5:04 - Louis Armstrong
"Let Your Light Shine"  – 4:26 - R. Kelly
"Precious Lord, Take My Hand"  – 3:26 - Faith Hill
"Heart So Heavy"  – 4:58 – John Mayer / Aaron Neville
"City Beneath The Sea"  – 5:58 - Harry Connick Jr.
"Ay-TeTe Fee"  – 1:53 - Clifton Chenier
"Moon Over Bourbon Street" (live)  – 4:56 – Sting with special guest Chris Botti
"Heart of America"  – 4:14 - Eric Benét, Michael McDonald, Wynonna Judd and Terry Dexter
"By Faith"  – 4:39 - Diddy featuring Fred Hammond
"Early In The Morning" (80th Session Alternate Version)  – 3:58 – B.B. King
"Fix You" (live)  – 6:03 – Coldplay
"When The Levee Broke"  – 5:43 – Clint Black
"Tears In Heaven"  – 4:20 – Mary J. Blige, Andrea Bocelli, Phil Collins, Robert Downey Jr., Josh Groban, Elton John, Katie Melua, Kelly Osbourne, Ozzy Osbourne, Pink, Gavin Rossdale, Ringo Starr, Gwen Stefani, Rod Stewart, Steven Tyler, Velvet Revolver
"Believe" (Acoustic Summer 2004)  – 4:30 - Lenny Kravitz
"Blue And Green"  – 5:39 – Van Morrison
"Mardi Gras In New Orleans"  – 2:51 - Professor Longhair
"Born On The Bayou" (live)  – 4:17 – John Fogerty

Disc: 2
"Any Other Day"  – 4:14 – Norah Jones & Wyclef Jean
"I Will Not Be Broken"  – 3:29 – Bonnie Raitt
"People Get Ready"  – 2:38 - Rod Stewart with Jerry Lawson and Talk of the Town
"We Can Make It Better"  – 3:48 – Kanye West featuring Talib Kweli, Q-Tip, Common, Rhymefest
"Try Me" (live)  – 2:35 – James Brown
"Louisiana Bayou" (live - 09.12.05)  – 8:18 - Dave Matthews Band featuring Robert Randolph
"Goin’ Back To New Orleans"  – 4:09 - Dr. John
"I'm Still Standing" (live, New Orleans April 2001)  – 3:17 – Elton John
"What Would Jesus Do"  – 4:05 – Chris Thomas King
"Alla Luce Del Sole" (live)  – 5:47 - Josh Groban with Bela Fleck
"Make A Change"  – 3:23 – Black Buddafly
"I Believe"  – 3:24 - Barbra Streisand
"Love & Mercy"  – 2:20 - Brian Wilson
"Coming Out Of The Dark/Always Tomorrow" (acoustic)  – 5:16 – Gloria Estefan
"Brothers" (live)  – 5:26 – The Neville Brothers
"After All" (live in New Orleans)  – 4:30 – The Winans family
"Come Together Now"  – 4:35 – Aaron Carter, Nick Carter, Chingy, Natalie Cole, Gavin DeGraw, Celine Dion, The Game, Garou, Anthony Hamilton, R.L. Huggard, Wyclef Jean, JoJo, Patti LaBelle, John Legend, Glenn Lewis, Kimberley Locke, Jesse McCartney, Brian McKnight, A.J. McLean, Mýa, Stacie Orrico, Kelly Price, Lee Ryan, Angie Stone, Joss Stone, Ruben Studdard, Tren'l
"When The Saints Go Marching Back In"  – 4:53 - Kirk Whalum with special guest Coolio, "CZ", Kyle Eastwood, Kyle Whalum, Rod McGaha & Wayman Tisdale

References

2005 compilation albums
Hurricane Katrina disaster relief charity albums